The European Federation of Psychologists' Associations is the umbrella organization of national societies in the field of psychology that are located in the European Economic Area.

History
The federation was founded in 1981 and the first general assembly was held in Heidelberg. Since then, general assemblies have been held every two years in different European cities. Since 1995, the general assembly is held in conjunction with the biennial European Congress of Psychology.

Aims
The federation is concerned with promoting and improving psychology as a profession and as a discipline, particularly, though not exclusively, in applied settings and with emphasis on the training and research associated with such practice. Its official journal is the European Psychologist. In 2009, the federation launched the EuroPsy register.

Member associations 
 the federation has 37 member associations, which together represent over 350,000 psychologists from all 27 members states of the European Union plus 3 members states of the EEA (Norway, Iceland, Liechtenstein) plus Albania, San Marino, Serbia, Switzerland, Turkey, Ukraine, United Kingdom. In addition, there are 14 organisations registered as associate member associations and 2 that are registered as affiliate member associations.

EuroPsy
One of the major initiatives of the federation was the establishment  of the EuroPsy or European Certificate in Psychology. This qualification sets a common standard for education, professional training and competence for psychologists to practice independently across Europe.

Aristotle Prize
The Aristotle Prize, established in 1995, is awarded by EFPA to a psychologist from Europe who has made a distinguished contribution to psychology.

Recipients of the prize have been: 
1995: Pieter Drenth
1997: Paul Baltes
1999: David Magnusson
2001: Alan Baddeley
2003: Lea Pulkkinen
2005: Rocio Fernandez-Ballesteros
2007: William Yule
2009: Claus Bundesen
2011: H. Marinus Van Ijzendoorn
2013: Niels Birbaumer
2015: José Maria Peiro
2017: CON AMORE – Center on Autobiographical Memory Research
2019: Naomi Ellemers

See also
European Federation of Psychology Students' Associations

References

External links

Psychology
International professional associations based in Europe
Medical and health organisations based in Belgium
Organisations based in Brussels
Federation of Psychologists' Associations
Educational organizations based in Europe
Psychology-related professional associations